A Great Day is a 2015 Nigerian short film written, produced, and directed by James Abinibi. The movie  showcases the determination of the life of a job seeker and it also  stars Whochay Nnadi, Kenny Solomon and Crystabel Goddy.

Synopsis 
The movie revolves around the sojourn of a young man who was called for an interview. During the journey, he faces different kinds of ordeals that would have made him to turn back but he was determined and keeps on going.

Premiere 
The movie was first premiered at Film House Cinema, Leisure Mall, Adeniran Ogunsanya in Surulere, Lagos Nigeria on  27 November, 2015. The premiering was attended by celebrities including Funky Mallam,  Shola Animashaun, Doris Simeon,  Emmanuel Ilemobayo, Bunmi Davies and others

Cast 

 Whochay Nnadi,
 Kenny Solomon,
 Crystabel Goddy,
 Emmanuel Ilemobayo and
 Cute Kiman

References 

2015 films
Nigerian short films